Winchester Special is an album by vibraphonist Lem Winchester with saxophonist Benny Golson recorded in 1959 and released on the New Jazz label.

Reception

Scott Yanow of Allmusic states: "The music falls between bop and hard bop with consistently swinging solos that are generally fairly inventive. This was one of Winchester's three recordings for the New Jazz label; all are easily recommended to straight ahead jazz fans".

Track listing 
 "Down Fuzz" (Lem Winchester) – 10:02
 "If I Were a Bell" (Frank Loesser) – 4:02
 "Will You Still Be Mine?" (Tom Adair, Matt Dennis) – 7:00
 "Mysticism" (Len Foster) – 7:31
 "How Are Things in Glocca Morra?" (Burton Lane, Yip Harburg) – 4:11
 "The Dude" (Winchester) – 6:42

Personnel 
Lem Winchester – vibraphone
Benny Golson – tenor saxophone (tracks 1 & 3-6)
Tommy Flanagan – piano
Wendell Marshall – bass
Art Taylor – drums

References 

Lem Winchester albums
Benny Golson albums
1959 albums
Albums recorded at Van Gelder Studio
New Jazz Records albums
Albums produced by Esmond Edwards